The Mayor's Office for Policing and Crime (MOPAC) is a functional body of the Greater London Authority responsible for oversight of the Metropolitan Police. It came into being on 16 January 2012 at midnight, replacing the Metropolitan Police Authority, as envisaged by the Police Reform and Social Responsibility Act 2011. The current Deputy Mayor for Policing and Crime is Sophie Linden.

Structure
The office is headed by the Mayor of London who acts in a similar capacity to the police and crime commissioners elsewhere in England. The Mayor can appoint a Deputy Mayor for Policing and Crime to act on their behalf. They are held to account by the Police and Crime Committee of the London Assembly.

Although the office is responsible for strategic oversight of the Metropolitan Police, all operational policing decisions remain the responsibility of the Commissioner of Police of the Metropolis. The office lacks the power to appoint or dismiss the commissioner.

External links
 Official website of the Mayor's Office for Policing and Crime

References

Metropolitan Police
2012 establishments in England
Greater London Authority functional bodies
2012 in British politics
2012 in London
Major precepting authorities in England
Governance of policing in England